Rachael Hegarty (born 1968) is a poet and educator from the Northside of Dublin, Ireland.

Rachael Hegarty is the Poet Laureate for Dublin 1.

Early childhood
Born the 7th of 10 kids in Broadstone, Dublin in 1968, Hegarty's early childhood was spent between the canals. She, her mother, and her brother David survived the Talbot Street Bombing of 17 May 1974. Her family no longer felt safe in the city centre and moved to Finglas after the Dublin and Monaghan bombings.[]

Education and travel
Hegarty's primary and secondary school education was with the Holy Faith sisters at Mother of Divine Grace and St. Michael's, Finglas. At 18 she moved to Boston, worked as a babysitter and got a scholarship to attend University of Massachusetts Boston. Hegarty returned home in 1994 and got her master's degree in Irish Literature at Trinity College Dublin. He father, Charlie, the Irish Olympic Judo Coach, died suddenly in 1996. She then moved, lived, and worked in Shimane, Japan from 1996 to 1999. Hegarty returned home again in 1999 and did her master's degree in Creative Writing at Trinity College Dublin. Rachael also completed her Ph.D. at Queen's University Belfast.

Career
Hegarty has been scribbling since she was a child hiding under the stairs and trying to escape housework. Her father gave her a dictionary, her siblings handed her pens and paper and her mother gave her a copy of William Blake’s Songs of Innocence and of Experience for her 13th birthday. Hegarty credits her mentor Paula Meehan for encouraging her to keep going with the poetry.
Hegarty also teaches English literature, language, creative writing, and academic skills at the Trinity Access Programme and CDETB. She thinks marginalized students should be at the centre of education.

Selected works
 Flight Paths Over Finglas, Salmon Poetry, 2017
 May Day 1974, Salmon Poetry, 2019
 Making Sense of Finglas, Ed. Dublin City Council 2020
 Dancing with Memory, Salmon Poetry, 2021

Awards and honours
 The Shine Strong Award
 The Francis Mc Manus Prize
 The Over the Edge New Writer of the Year

References

External links
 Poem of the week: The Waves at Spanish Point Irish Times
 Poem of the week: Communion Irish Times
 The Dublin bombings: Sonnets and ballads in memory of the victims Irish Times
 The Dublin-Monaghan bombings - Rachael Hegarty remembers RTÉ
 English Grammar and Ukrainian Poetry, by Rachael Hegarty RTÉ
 Jimmy-Joes, One Year On, a poem by Rachael Hegarty RTÉ
 St Nick’s in the Liberties, a poem by Rachael Hegarty RTÉ

1968 births
Living people
Writers from Dublin (city)
20th-century Irish poets
21st-century Irish poets
Irish women poets
University of Massachusetts Boston alumni
Alumni of Trinity College Dublin
Alumni of Queen's University Belfast